Philadelphia Federal Credit Union (PFCU) is a credit union headquartered in Philadelphia.  It is chartered and regulated under the National Credit Union Administration (NCUA).

PFCU is the sixth largest credit union in Philadelphia. PFCU has more than US$900 million in assets, and over 112,000 members. The PFCU Operations Center is located at 12800 Townsend Road in Philadelphia.

History
April 16, 1951 - PFCU receives its charter from the NCUA.

1983 - the Temple University Federal Credit Union merges with PFCU.

October 10, 1998 - PFCU relocates its operations center to Townsend Road.

April 16, 2001 - PFCU celebrates its 50th anniversary.

April 16, 2011 - PFCU celebrates its 60th anniversary.

June 2012 – PFCU acquires New Bethel AME Federal Credit Union.

Membership
PFCU is a member-owned, not-for-profit financial institution that requires membership. To become a member, a person must live, work, conduct business, worship, or study in Philadelphia or Columbia County, Pennsylvania or be a current or retired employee from a Select Employer Group.

References

Credit unions based in Pennsylvania
1951 establishments in Pennsylvania